Hady Pfeifer, née Lantschner (22 September 1906 – 10 December 2002) was an Austrian and later German alpine skier who competed in the 1936 Winter Olympics.

She was born in Innsbruck, Austria.

In 1936 she finished fifth in the alpine skiing combined event.

External links
 Alpine skiing 1936  
 Hady Pfeiffer's profile at Sports Reference.com

1906 births
2002 deaths
Austrian female alpine skiers
German female alpine skiers
Olympic alpine skiers of Germany
Sportspeople from Innsbruck
Alpine skiers at the 1936 Winter Olympics